Naked Sky Entertainment was an independent game development studio based in Los Angeles. They are a licensed developer for Microsoft Windows, Xbox 360, PlayStation 3, and iOS.

Games
RoboBlitz (2006)
Star Trek DAC (2009)
MicroBot (2010)
Twister Mania (2011)
A Million Minions (2012)
Aligned (2012)
Max Axe (2013)
Scrap Force (2014)

References

External links
Official Website
Official RoboBlitz Website
GameFAQs company Profile

Video game companies of the United States
Companies based in Los Angeles